Mårum is a town in the Gribskov Municipality in North Zealand, Denmark. It is located six kilometers east of Helsinge and four kilometers north of Kagerup.  As of 2022, it has a population of 240.

References 

Cities and towns in the Capital Region of Denmark
Gribskov Municipality